Byrrhodes is a genus of death-watch and spider beetles in the family Ptinidae. There are about 14 described species in Byrrhodes.

Species
These 14 species belong to the genus Byrrhodes:

 Byrrhodes facilis (Fall, 1905) i c g b
 Byrrhodes fallax (Fall, 1905) i c g
 Byrrhodes grandis White, 1973 i c g
 Byrrhodes granus (LeConte, 1878) i c g b
 Byrrhodes incomptus (LeConte, 1865) i c g b
 Byrrhodes intermedius (LeConte, 1878) i c g b
 Byrrhodes levisternus (Fall, 1905) i c g b
 Byrrhodes omnistrius Ford, 1998 i c g
 Byrrhodes ovatus White, 1981 i c g
 Byrrhodes setosus LeConte, 1878 i c g
 Byrrhodes tomokunii Sakai, 1996 g
 Byrrhodes tristiatus (LeConte, 1878) i c g
 Byrrhodes tristriatus b
 Byrrhodes ulkei (Fall, 1905) i c g

Data sources: i = ITIS, c = Catalogue of Life, g = GBIF, b = Bugguide.net

References

Bostrichiformia genera
Ptinidae